Mark Halliday (born 1949 in Ann Arbor, Michigan) is an American poet, professor and critic. He is author of seven collections of poetry, most recently "Losers Dream On" (University of Chicago Press, 2018), "Thresherphobe" (University of Chicago Press, 2013) and Keep This Forever (Tupelo Press, 2008). His honors include serving as the 1994 poet in residence at The Frost Place, inclusion in several annual editions of The Best American Poetry series and of the Pushcart Prize anthology, receiving a 2006  Guggenheim Fellowship, and winning the 2001 Rome Prize from the American Academy of Arts and Letters.

Halliday earned his B.A. (1971) and M.A. (1976) from Brown University, and his Ph.D. in English literature from Brandeis University in 1983, where he studied with poets Allen Grossman and Frank Bidart. He has taught English literature and writing at Wellesley College, the University of Pennsylvania, Western Michigan University, Indiana University. Since 1996, he has taught at Ohio University, where, in 2012, he was awarded the rank of distinguished professor.  He is married to J. Allyn Rosser.

Personal life

Mark Halliday was born in Ann Arbor, Michigan, in 1949, and grew up in Raleigh, North Carolina, and Westport, Connecticut. Halliday lost his mother at the age of 25. He has a son, Nicholas, by his first marriage. He is married to American poet Jill Allyn Rosser whom he met at the University of Pennsylvania. They live in Athens, Ohio, and have a daughter named Devon.

Literary influences and praise

Halliday's poetry is characterized by close observation of daily events, out-of-the-ordinary metaphors, unsentimental reminiscence, colloquial diction, references to popular culture, and uncommon humor. The poet David Graham has described Halliday as one of the "ablest practitioners" of the "ultra-talk poem," a term said to have been coined by Halliday himself to describe the work of a group of contemporary American poets, including David Kirby, Denise Duhamel, David Clewell, Albert Goldbarth, and Barbara Hamby, who frequently write in a wry, exuberant, garrulous, accessible style.  Halliday has acknowledged the influences of New York School poets Frank O’Hara and Kenneth Koch on some of his poems. Charles Pitter for Zouch has said Halliday's poetry "dazzles with verbal precocity".

Published works

Poetry

 Losers Dream On University of Chicago Press, 2018
 Thresherphobe (University of Chicago Press, 2013)
 Keep This Forever (Tupelo Press, 2008)
 Jab (University of Chicago Press, 2002)
 Selfwolf (University of Chicago Press, 1999)
 Tasker Street (University of Massachusetts Press,  1992, Juniper Prize winner)
 Little Star (W. Morrow, 1987, National Poetry Series selection)

Criticism

 Stevens and the Interpersonal (Princeton University Press, 1991)
 The Sighted Singer: Two Works on Poetry for Readers and Writers (Johns Hopkins University Press, 1991, co-authored with Allen Grossman)
 Against Our Vanishing: Winter Conversations with Allen Grossman (Rowan Tree Press, 1981, co-authored with Allen Grossman)

References

External links
 Audio: Recordings of seven works read by Halliday with photograph
 Audio: Slate text and recording of Halliday poem Frankfort Laundromat
 Poem: Library of Congress > Poetry 180 Series > ''Key to the Highway by Mark Halliday
 Audio: Slate Text and recording of Halliday poem "The Fedge" from Slate

1949 births
Living people
American male poets
Brandeis University alumni
Brown University alumni
Ohio University faculty
People from Athens, Ohio
Poets from Ohio
Writers from Ann Arbor, Michigan